Hrvoje Kačić (13 January 1932 – 14 February 2023) was a Croatian water polo player, legal scholar and politician.

Biography
Kačić was born in Dubrovnik on 13 January 1932. At the age of 18, Kačić played for the Yugoslavia national water polo team at the 1950 European Water Polo Championship at which the team won bronze. During the 1950s he became out of favour with Yugoslavia's communist regime and had his passport confiscated on three occasions. He was jailed by the regime in 1952 which prevented him from joining the national team at the 1952 Summer Olympics. He was also expelled from university.

Kačić competed with the national team at the 1956 Summer Olympics, during which his friend and teammate Ivo Štakula defected to Australia. In 1957, he was awarded the Sportske novosti Croatian Sportsman of the Year. At the 1959 Mediterranean Games he won a gold medal. On the club level he was a long-time member of Croatian waterpolo club Jug from Dubrovnik, multiple national champion.

In 1956 he finished a degree in law. He later finished a doctorate in law in 1965 at the University of Zagreb, specializing in maritime law. Kačić also wrote about history. He has collaborated with Ivo Pilar Institute of History.

Kačić was elected to the Croatian Parliament for the first time in the country's first democratic elections in 1990 as an independent candidate. From 1994 to 2001 he was president of the State Commission for Borders of the Republic of Croatia.

In 1994 he received the Croatian Olympic Committee's Matija Ljubek Award. He has served on the committee which gives out the Franjo Bučar State Award for Sport. Kačić still actively supported Croatian water polo, retaining a position in the Croatian Water Polo Federation and supporting the national team.

Kačić died on 14 February 2023, at the age of 91.

See also
 List of Olympic medalists in water polo (men)

References

External links
 

1932 births
2023 deaths
People from Dubrovnik
Croatian male water polo players
Croatian lawyers
Representatives in the modern Croatian Parliament
Olympic medalists in water polo
Medalists at the 1956 Summer Olympics
Olympic silver medalists for Yugoslavia
Mediterranean Games gold medalists for Yugoslavia
Competitors at the 1959 Mediterranean Games
Mediterranean Games medalists in water polo
Water polo players at the 1956 Summer Olympics
Water polo players at the 1960 Summer Olympics